The former headquarters of Banco Central Hispano is located in Madrid, Spain. It was declared Bien de Interés Cultural in 1999.

References 

Buildings and structures in Sol neighborhood, Madrid
Banco Santander
Bien de Interés Cultural landmarks in the Community of Madrid